Parasciadonus is a genus of blind cusk eels found in the western Pacific Ocean.

Species
There are currently two recognized species in this genus:
 Parasciadonus brevibrachium J. G. Nielsen, 1984
 Parasciadonus pauciradiatus J. G. Nielsen, 1997

References

Aphyonidae